Goumsin is a town in the Kayao Department of Bazèga Province in central Burkina Faso. The town has a population of 2,247.

Within the framework of the Foyer Social Educatif du lycée Théodore Deck de Guebwiller, the educational college in partnership with the Aide au Développement has worked with young students in the town to develop educationally.

References

Populated places in the Centre-Sud Region
Bazèga Province